Sara, formerly known as Que Sera Sera, is a 2015 Hong Kong psychological thriller film directed by Herman Yau and starring Charlene Choi and Simon Yam. The film was released on March 5, 2015.

Plot
After being sexually abused as a child by her stepfather, Sara (Choi) runs away from home, earns her own keep and spends her nights in various locales, including country parks and fast-food joints that stay open 24 hours.
While hanging around the Tsim Sha Tsui East promenade late one evening, she meets the gentlemanly, middle-aged Kam Ho-yin (Simon Yam Tat-wah). The two embark on a complex relationship that involves his getting her into a good school and a new life she chooses to take.

Cast
 Charlene Choi as Sara Ho
 Simon Yam as Kam Ho-yin
 Sunadcha Tadrabiab as Dok-my, an underage prostitute in Thailand
 Ryan Lau as Raymond, Sara's boyfriend
 Alien Sun as Tong May, Sara's mother
 Tony Ho as Kwok Wah, Sara's stepfather
 Benson Ling as Patrick
 Lam Chiu-wing as Magazine Chief Editor
 Mimi Kung as Kam Ho-yin's wife
 Tsui Siu-wa as University professor

Reception

Box office
The film has grossed HK$6.27 million (US$808,000) over four days. In the second week, the film has grossed HK$4.14 million (US$533,000). In the fourth week, the film has grossed HK$3.32 million (US$429,000) with a total of HK$18.1 million (US$2.34 million).

Awards

References

External links
 

2015 films
2015 psychological thriller films
Films directed by Herman Yau
Hong Kong psychological thriller films
2010s Hong Kong films